In geometry, the elliptic coordinate system is a two-dimensional orthogonal coordinate system in which the coordinate lines are confocal ellipses and hyperbolae.

Basic definition

The most common definition of elliptic coordinates  is

where  is a nonnegative real number and 

On the complex plane, an equivalent relationship is

These definitions correspond to ellipses and hyperbolae.  The trigonometric identity

shows that curves of constant  form ellipses, whereas the hyperbolic trigonometric identity

shows that curves of constant  form hyperbolae.

Scale factors

In an orthogonal coordinate system the lengths of the basis vectors are known as scale factors. The scale factors for the elliptic coordinates  are equal to

Using the double argument identities for hyperbolic functions and trigonometric functions, the scale factors can be equivalently expressed as

Consequently, an infinitesimal element of area equals

and the Laplacian reads 

Alternative definition

An alternative and geometrically intuitive set of elliptic coordinates  are sometimes used, 
Hence, the curves of constant  are ellipses, whereas the curves of constant  are hyperbolae. The coordinate  must belong to the interval [-1, 1], whereas the  
coordinate must be greater than or equal to one.
 
For any point in the plane, the sum  of its distances to the foci equals , whereas their difference  equals .

A drawback of these coordinates is that the points with Cartesian coordinates (x,y) and (x,-y) have the same coordinates , so the conversion to Cartesian coordinates is not a function, but a multifunction.

Alternative scale factors

The scale factors for the alternative elliptic coordinates  are 

Hence, the infinitesimal area element becomes 

and the Laplacian equals

Other differential operators such as  
and  can be expressed in the coordinates  by substituting 
the scale factors into the general formulae 
found in orthogonal coordinates.

Extrapolation to higher dimensions

Elliptic coordinates form the basis for several sets of three-dimensional orthogonal coordinates: 
The elliptic cylindrical coordinates are produced by projecting in the -direction.
The prolate spheroidal coordinates are produced by rotating the elliptic coordinates about the -axis, i.e., the axis connecting the foci, whereas the oblate spheroidal coordinates are produced by rotating the elliptic coordinates about the -axis, i.e., the axis separating the foci. 
Ellipsoidal coordinates are a formal extension of elliptic coordinates into 3-dimensions, which is based on confocal ellipsoids, hyperboloids of one and two sheets.

Applications

The classic applications of elliptic coordinates are in solving partial differential equations, 
e.g., Laplace's equation or the Helmholtz equation, for which elliptic coordinates are a natural description of a system thus allowing a separation of variables in the partial differential equations.  Some traditional examples are solving systems such as electrons orbiting a molecule or planetary orbits that have an elliptical shape. 

The geometric properties of elliptic coordinates can also be useful.  A typical example might involve 
an integration over all pairs of vectors  and  
that sum to a fixed vector , where the integrand 
(In such a case, one would position  between the two foci and aligned with the -axis, i.e., .) For concreteness,  and  could represent the momenta of a particle and its decomposition products, respectively, and the integrand might involve the kinetic energies of the products (which are proportional to the squared lengths of the momenta).

See also
Curvilinear coordinates
Ellipsoidal coordinates
Generalized coordinates

References
 
 Korn GA and Korn TM. (1961) Mathematical Handbook for Scientists and Engineers, McGraw-Hill.
 Weisstein, Eric W. "Elliptic Cylindrical Coordinates." From MathWorld — A Wolfram Web Resource. http://mathworld.wolfram.com/EllipticCylindricalCoordinates.html

Two-dimensional coordinate systems